Samuel John Small (15 May 1912 – 19 December 1993) was an English footballer who played as a centre-forward in the Football League for Birmingham, West Ham United and Brighton & Hove Albion.

Born in Gosta Green, Birmingham, Small started his career at Bromsgrove Rovers. He made six league appearances for Birmingham before signing for West Ham United in 1937. He scored the only goal in the Football League War Cup final against Blackburn Rovers in 1940.

After 116 league and cup appearances and 41 goals for the east London club, Small transferred to Brighton & Hove Albion in March 1948 and made 38 league appearances without return.

He died in Birmingham aged 81.

References

1912 births
1993 deaths
Footballers from Birmingham, West Midlands
English footballers
Association football forwards
Bromsgrove Rovers F.C. players
Birmingham City F.C. players
West Ham United F.C. players
Brighton & Hove Albion F.C. players
English Football League players